Saint Lucia Channel is a strait in the Caribbean that separates French island Martinique, to the north,  and Saint Lucia, in the south. It is a pathway between Caribbean sea and Atlantic ocean.  The Diamond Rock is in the St. Lucia Canal.

History 
On August 17, 2007, Hurricane Dean crossed the channel as a Category 2 storm.

See also 
Martinique Passage
Barbados–France Maritime Delimitation Agreement
France–Saint Lucia Delimitation Agreement
Saint Vincent Passage

References

Straits of the Caribbean
Bodies of water of Martinique
Bodies of water of Saint Lucia
Martinique–Saint Lucia border
International straits